FDIC International (Fire Department Instructors Conference) is an annual firefighting conference and exhibition held at the Indiana Convention Center and Lucas Oil Stadium in Indianapolis, Indiana. It is one of Indianapolis's biggest conventions.

Overview 

The annual expo, organized by Clarion Events and hosted primarily at the Indiana Convention Center, features firefighting apparatus and fire industry technology. In 2016, it was attended by more than 30,000 firefighters, chiefs, officers and instructors from 53 countries. 
 
The conference has an economic impact on Indianapolis of about $35 to US$40 million.

The conference was cancelled in 2020 due to COVID-19. It returned to the Indiana Convention Center and Lucas Oil Stadium in August 2021 with attendance down between 25% and 30%.

It is scheduled to be held in Indianapolis through 2028.

History 
The first conference was held in 1929 in Chicago to discuss training measures. By 1939 the attendance had reached a high of 247 people from 28 states as well as Washington, D.C. Early host cities also include Memphis, Tennessee where it was hosted by the Memphis Fire Services and St. Louis hosted by the St. Louis Fire Department. FDICI was established in Indianapolis in 1998.

No convention was held in 2020 as the COVID-19 pandemic forced its cancellation.

References

External links 
 FDIC International
 2014 FDIC Photos

Firefighting in the United States
Annual events in Indiana